Oodini is a ground beetle tribe in the subfamily Harpalinae. Oodines are found worldwide (with highest diversity in tropical Africa) and are generally associated with standing water. This tribe contains more than 400 species arrayed in 43 genera. Beetles in Oodini are distinguishable from other members of Carabidae by a combination of two characters: a laterally coadunate metepisternum (a feature of the exoskeleton), and an elytral ridge formed by the fusion of intervals 7 and 8.

Genera
These 43 genera belong to the tribe Oodini:

 Acanthoodes Basilewsky, 1953
 Acutosternus Lecordier & Girard, 1988
 Adelopomorpha Heller, 1916
 Anatrichis LeConte, 1853
 Bamaroodes Gueorguiev, 2014
 Brachyodes Jeannel, 1949
 Chaetocrepis Chaudoir, 1857
 Coptocarpus Chaudoir, 1857
 Dercylinus Chaudoir, 1883
 Dercylus Laporte, 1832
 Dicaelindus W.S.MacLeay, 1825
 Evolenes LeConte, 1853
 Geobaenus Dejean, 1829
 Holcocoleus Chaudoir, 1883
 Hoplolenus LaFerté-Sénectère, 1851
 Lobatodes Basilewsky, 1956
 Lonchosternus LaFerté-Sénectère, 1851
 Macroprotus Chaudoir, 1878
 Megaloodes Lesne, 1896
 Melanchiton Andrewes, 1940
 Melanchrous Andrewes, 1940
 Microodes Jeannel, 1949
 Miltodes Andrewes, 1922
 Nanodiodes Bousquet, 1996
 Neoodes Basilewsky, 1953
 Nothoodes Gueorguiev & Liang, 2020
 Oodes Bonelli, 1810
 Oodinus Motschulsky, 1865
 Orthocerodus Basilewsky, 1946
 Polychaetus Chaudoir, 1882
 Prionognathus LaFerté-Sénectère, 1851
 Protopidius Basilewsky, 1949
 Pseudoodes Gueorguiev & Liang, 2020
 Pseudosphaerodes Jeannel, 1949
 Simous Chaudoir, 1882
 Sphaerodinus Jeannel, 1949
 Sphoerodes Chaudoir, 1883
 Stenocrepis Chaudoir, 1857
 Sundaoodes Gueorguiev & Liang, 2020
 Systolocranius Chaudoir, 1857
 Thaioodes Gueorguiev, 2014
 Thryptocerus Chaudoir, 1878
 Trichopalpoodes B.Gueorguiev & J.Schmidt, 2016

References

Licininae
Beetle tribes